The Xavante are an indigenous people of Brazil.

Xavante may also refer to:

 Xavante language, the language of the Xavante people
 Xavante River (Mato Grosso)
 Xavante River (Tocantins)
 Embraer AT-26 Xavante, a Brazilian version of the Aermacchi MB-326 aircraft

See also
 Xavantina, Santa Catarina, Brazil